Seyitler is a village in the Artvin District, Artvin Province, Turkey. Its population is 2,367 (2021).

The village was founded by merging three former villages in 1925.  The village was a typical cattle breeding village. But after the foundadition the Artvin Çoruh University campus near the village the main economic sector of the village shifted to services.

References

Villages in Artvin District